Stringtown is the name of several places in the U.S. state of West Virginia:

Stringtown, Barbour County, West Virginia, an unincorporated community
Stringtown, Marion County, West Virginia, an unincorporated community
Stringtown, Roane County, West Virginia, an unincorporated community
Stringtown, Tucker County, West Virginia, a ghost town
Stringtown, Tyler County, West Virginia, an unincorporated community